Puerto Rico Highway 18 (PR-18) is a freeway in Puerto Rico, which is also known as Expreso Las Américas. It runs from its north end at its intersection with PR-22 (known as Expreso José de Diego) in San Juan to its south end in Río Piedras where it intersects with PR-1. At this point PR-18 becomes PR-52, known as Autopista Luis A. Ferré.

Route description
PR-18 connects PR-52 to PR-22 and intersects with Jesus de Piñero Avenue (PR-17), Franklin Delano Roosevelt Avenue (PR-23), which grants access to Plaza Las Américas, and Domenech Avenue. It is mostly a 4-lane road in each direction. The combined route of PR-18 and PR-52 is coterminous with the unsigned Interstate Highway PRI-1.

Exit list

See also

 Interstate Highways in Puerto Rico
 List of highways numbered 18

References

External links
 

018
18
Roads in San Juan, Puerto Rico

eu:Interstate PRI-1